Monodilepas monilifera is a species of small sea snail or limpets, a marine gastropod mollusc in the family Fissurellidae, the keyhole limpets. 

This species is known only from New Zealand. Shell size 13-35 mm.

Subspecies are:

 Monodilepas monilifera carnleyensis Powell, 1955
 Monodilepas monilifera cookiana Dell, 1953
 Monodilepas monilifera monilifera (Hutton, 1873)

References

 Powell A. W. B., William Collins Publishers Ltd, Auckland 1979 

Fissurellidae
Gastropods of New Zealand
Gastropods described in 1873